Koyun Island (literally "Sheep Island") is a Turkish island in the Sea of Marmara. At  it is a part of Erdek ilçe (district) of Balıkesir Province. It is situated between the better known islands of Avşa Island and Paşalimanı Island.

The island is a long island from north to south. There are only a few summer houses on the otherwise uninhabited island.

References

Islands of the Sea of Marmara
Islands of Turkey
Islands of Balıkesir Province
Erding (district)